Edward Silva (born ) is an Uruguayan male weightlifter, competing in the 76 kg category and representing Uruguay at international competitions. He participated at the 1996 Summer Olympics in the 76 kg event. He competed at world championships, most recently at the 1997 World Weightlifting Championships.

Major results

References

External links
 

1975 births
Living people
Weightlifters at the 1996 Summer Olympics
Olympic weightlifters of Uruguay
Place of birth missing (living people)
Weightlifters at the 1999 Pan American Games
Weightlifters at the 2003 Pan American Games
Weightlifters at the 2007 Pan American Games
Pan American Games competitors for Uruguay
20th-century Uruguayan people
21st-century Uruguayan people